Mr. Scarlet and Pinky the Whiz Kid are two duo fictional comic book superheroes connected to each other, and first introduced in  Wow Comics. The superheroes were originally published by Fawcett Comics and later by DC Comics. The original Mister Scarlet was Brian Butler debuting in Wow Comics #1 (cover-dated Winter 1940-41), and was created by France Herron and Jack Kirby while Pinky Butler (Brian's son) became his sidekick, Pinky the Whiz Kid. After Brian's death, Pinky takes over the role as Mr. Scarlet in DC's continuity. Pinky Butler premiered in the fourth issue of Wow Comics and was created  by Otto Binder and Jack Binder.

Publication history
Mr. Scarlet, created by writer France Herron and artist Jack Kirby debuted in Fawcett Comics' Wow Comics #1 (Winter 1940-41) and was the cover feature for five issues of that anthology comic. He later appeared in Fawcett's Mary Marvel #9 (February 1947). After the Fawcett properties were acquired by National Comics Publications, the future DC Comics, Mr. Scarlet appeared in Justice League of America #135-137 (Oct.-Dec. 1976).

Fictional character biography

Brian Butler

Mr. Scarlet is district attorney Brian Butler, who along with his adopted son Pinky the Whiz Kid, fought evil in his city for several years. His success was such that his employment was frequently in jeopardy due to a lack of crime. As a result throughout his series, he took up several odd jobs to supplement his family's income. He used inventive devices to help him apprehend criminals, and had great acrobatic and hand-to-hand combatant skills.

In his first appearance in Wow Comics #1, Brian was based in Gotham City. This may be the first use of the name of this city in comics. Later retcons established Mr. Scarlet's base in either New York City or Fawcett City.

The heroes tangle with a wide variety of villains, including the sinister Death Battalion, who plan the assassinations of top government officials. The Battalion's members include Dr. Death, the Ghost, the Horned Hood, the Black Thorn, the Black Clown, the Laughing Skull, and their leader known as "the Brain" is actually the warden of El Catraz prison.

Although initially appearing in the 1940s, Mr. Scarlet and Pinky were revealed to still be active and at relatively the same age level in the 1970s during a team-up with the Justice League of America and Justice Society of America in Justice League of America 135-137. It was during this team-up that the two crime-fighters joined with several other heroes from Earth-S to form Shazam's Squadron of Justice.

Pinky Butler

Pinky was the adopted son of district attorney Brian Butler, also known as Mr. Scarlet, who fought evil in his city for several years. His father's success was such that his employment was frequently in jeopardy due to a lack of crime. As a result, he throughout his series took up several odd jobs to supplement his family's income.

Although initially appearing in the 1940s, Mr. Scarlet and Pinky were revealed to still be active and at relatively the same age level in the 1970s during a team-up with the Justice League of America and Justice Society of America. It was during this teamup that the two crimefighters joined with several other heroes to form Shazam's Squadron of Justice, because King Kull had captured Shazam and the Elders that gave the Marvel Family their powers, and was trying to wipe out humanity on all three Earths. Scarlet and Pinky helped defeat the Weeper and Earth-2 Joker while they committed crimes on Earth-S and turned people into diamonds, although no further adventures of this team were chronicled thereafter.

After the Crisis on Infinite Earths, Pinky Butler is revealed to have taken over the identity of his father Mr. Scarlet after his death, having been active in Fawcett City for several years. It is also revealed how they retained their youth since the 1940s, as the wizard Shazam provided a protective field around the city for decades allowing its inhabitants to age slower than their contemporaries in other cities.

Pinky first appeared as Mr. Scarlet in The Power of Shazam #44.

Mr. Scarlet later rescues Freddy Freeman from Prometheus' captivity, alongside the Bulleteer.

In "The New Golden Age", Pinky was shown to be a captive of a Time Scavenger called Childminder. His voice can be heard coming from the same cell as Blue Beetle's sidekick Sparky.

Other versions
 A new version of Mr. Scarlet appeared in Elseworlds' Kingdom Come and The Kingdom miniseries. Mr. Scarlet is drawn as a bright red devil of a man known for hanging out at Titans Tower bar with Matrix, the new Joker's daughter, and the new Thunder. He has a large crest running down his hood, based on the fin on the original's cowl.

References

External links
 DCU Guide: Mister Scarlet
 DCU Guide: Mister Scarlet Chronology

Golden Age superheroes
Comics characters introduced in 1940
Comics characters introduced in 1941
Fawcett Comics superheroes
DC Comics superheroes
Characters created by France Herron
Characters created by Jack Kirby
Fictional district attorneys
DC Comics sidekicks
Superheroes who are adopted
Characters created by Otto Binder
Characters created by Jack Binder